Bambusa comillensis is a species of Bambusa bamboo.

Distribution
Bambusa comillensis is endemic to Bangladesh.

References

comillensis
Flora of Bangladesh